Ilario, A Story of the First History is a novel by Mary Gentle, published as two novels in the USA, set in an alternate history where Carthage has become a powerful medieval empire.

Synopsis 
Set in the same alternate medieval world as Gentle's Ash: A Secret History sequence, Ilario, A Story of the First History is more limited in scope. The protagonist, Ilario, is an intersex person seeking to serve as apprentice to a master painter, a path that takes Ilario from Iberia to Carthage, Rome, Venice and Constantinople. Described as "part picaresque, part travelogue, part prose chanson de geste", the story serves to examine issues of gender, sexuality, and power.

Reception 
Roz Kaveney, reviewing The Lion's Eye for Time Out described the book as "action-packed, deeply intelligent novel a focus for intrigue, intellectual debate and a fair amount of polymorphous hot sexual action". Strange Horizons found the book "something of a disappointment", with "precious few changes of tone".

Ilario novels 

Ilario: The Lion's Eye. London: Gollancz, 2006. 
Ilario: The Lion's Eye. New York: EOS, 2007. 
Ilario: The Stone Golem. New York: EOS, 2007.

References 

British fantasy novels
Novels about intersex
2000s novels
British LGBT novels
2006 British novels
Victor Gollancz Ltd books